A lost work is a document, literary work, or piece of multimedia produced some time in the past, of which no surviving copies are known to exist. It can only be known through reference. This term most commonly applies to works from the classical world, although it is increasingly used in relation to modern works. A work may be lost to history through the destruction of an original manuscript and all later copies.

Works—or, commonly, small fragments of works—have survived by being found by archaeologists during investigations, or accidentally by anybody, such as, for example, the Nag Hammadi library scrolls. Works also survived when they were reused as bookbinding materials, quoted or included in other works, or as palimpsests, where an original document is imperfectly erased so the substrate on which it was written can be reused. The discovery, in 1822, of Cicero's De re publica was one of the first major recoveries of a lost ancient text from a palimpsest. Another famous example is the discovery of the Archimedes palimpsest, which was used to make a prayer book almost 300 years after the original work was written. A work may be recovered in a library, as a lost or mislabeled codex, or as a part of another book or codex.

Well known but not recovered works are described by compilations that did survive, such as the Naturalis Historia of Pliny the Elder or the De Architectura of Vitruvius. Sometimes authors will destroy their own works. On other occasions, authors instruct others to destroy their work after their deaths. This should have happened with several pieces, but did not, such as Virgil's Aeneid, which was saved by Augustus, and Kafka's novels, which were saved by Max Brod. Handwritten copies of manuscripts existed in limited numbers before the era of printing. The destruction of ancient libraries, whether by intent, chance or neglect, resulted in the loss of numerous works. Works to which no subsequent reference is preserved remain unknown.

Deliberate destruction of works may be termed literary crime or literary vandalism (see book burning).

Lost works

Classical world

Specific titles
 Agatharchides
Ta kata ten Asian (Affairs in Asia) in 10 books
 Ta kata ten Europen (Affairs in Europe) in 49 books
 Peri ten Erythras thalasses (On the Erythraean Sea) in 5 books
 Agrippina the Younger
 Casus suorum (Misfortunes of her Family, a memoir)
 Alexander Polyhistor
 Successions of Philosophers
 Sulpicius Alexander
 Historia (History)
 Anaxagoras
 Book of Philosophy. Only fragments of the first part have survived.
 Apollodorus of Athens
 Chronicle (Χρονικά), a Greek history in verse
 On the Gods (Περὶ θεῶν), known through quotes to have included etymologies of the names and epithets of the gods
 A twelve-book essay about Homer's Catalogue of Ships
 Archimedes
 On Sphere-Making
 On Polyhedra
 Aristarchus of Samos
 Astronomy book outlining his heliocentrism (astronomical model in which the Earth and planets revolve around a relatively stationary Sun)
 Aristotle
 second book of Poetics, dealing with comedy
 On the Pythagoreans
 Protrepticus (fragments survived)
 Augustus
 Rescript to Brutus Respecting Cato
 Exhortations to Philosophy
 History of His Own Life
 Sicily (a work in verse)
 Epigrams
 Berossus
 Babyloniaca (History of Babylonia)
 Gaius Julius Caesar
 Anticatonis Libri II (only fragments survived)
 Carmina et prolusiones (only fragments survived)
 De analogia libri II ad M. Tullium Ciceronem
 De astris liber
 Dicta collectanea ("collected sayings", also known by the Greek title άποφθέγματα)
 Letters (only fragments survived)
 Epistulae ad Ciceronem ('Letters to Cicero')
 Epistulae ad familiares ('Letters to Relatives')
 Iter ('journey')) (only one fragment survived)
 Laudes Herculis
 Libri auspiciorum ("books of auspices", also known as Auguralia)
 Oedipus
 other works:
 contributions to the libri pontificales as pontifex maximus
 possibly some early love poems
Callinicus
Against the Philosophical Sects
On the Renewal of Rome
Prosphonetikon to Gallienus,  a salute addressed to the emperor
To Cleopatra, On the History of Alexandria, most likely dedicated to Zenobia, who claimed descent from Cleopatra
To Lupus, On Bad Taste on Rhetoric
 Callisthenes
 An account of Alexander's expedition
 A history of Greece from the Peace of Antalcidas (387) to the Third Sacred War (357)
 A history of the Phocian war
 Cato the Elder
 Origines, a 7-book history of Rome and the Italian states.
 Carmen de moribus, a book of prayers or incantations for the dead in verse.
 Praecepta ad Filium, a collection of maxims.
 A collection of his speeches.
 Marcus Tullius Cicero
 Hortensius a dialogue also known as "On Philosophy".
 Consolatio, written to soothe his own sadness at the death of his daughter Tullia
 Quintus Tullius Cicero
 Four tragedies in the Greek style: Troas, Erigones, Electra, and one other.
 Helvius Cinna
Zmyrna, a mythological epic poem about the incestuous love of Smyrna (or Myrrha) for her father Cinyras
 Claudius
 De arte aleae ('"The art of playing dice, a book on dice games)
 an Etruscan dictionary
 an Etruscan history
 a history of Augustus' reign
 eight volumes on Carthaginian history
 a defense of Cicero against the charges of Asinius Gallus
 Cleitarchus
 History of Alexander
 Ctesibius
 On pneumatics, a work describing force pumps
 Memorabilia, a compilation of his research works
 Ctesias
 Persica, a history of Assyria and Persia in 23 books
 Indica, an account of India
 Diodorus Siculus
 Bibliotheca historia (Historical Library). Of 40 books, only books 1–5 and 10–20 are extant.
 Eratosthenes
 Περὶ τῆς ἀναμετρήσεως τῆς γῆς (On the Measurement of the Earth; lost, summarized by Cleomedes)
 Geographica (lost, criticized by Strabo)
 Arsinoe (a memoir of queen Arsinoe; lost; quoted by Athenaeus in the Deipnosophistae)
 Euclid
 Conics, a work on conic sections later extended by Apollonius of Perga into his famous work on the subject.
 Porisms, the exact meaning of the title is controversial (probably "corollaries").
 Pseudaria, or Book of Fallacies, an elementary text about errors in reasoning.
 Surface Loci concerned either loci (sets of points) on surfaces or loci which were themselves surfaces.
 Eudemus
 History of Arithmetics, on the early history of Greek arithmetics (only one short quote survives)
 History of Astronomy, on the early history of Greek astronomy (several quotes survive)
 History of Geometry, on the early history of Greek geometry (several quotes survive)
 Verrius Flaccus
 De Orthographia: De Obscuris Catonis, an elucidation of obscurities in the writings of Cato the Elder
 Saturnus, dealing with questions of Roman ritual
 Rerum memoria dignarum libri, an encyclopaedic work much used by Pliny the Elder
 Res Etruscae, probably on augury
 Frontinus
 De re militari, a military manual
 Gorgias
 On Non-Existence (or On Nature). Only two sketches of it exist.
 Epitaphios. What exists is thought to be only a small fragment of a significantly longer piece.
 The Hesiodic Catalogue of Women Homer
 Margites The Odyssey mentions the blind singer Demodocus performing a poem recounting the otherwise unknown "Quarrel of Odysseus and Achilles", which might have been an actual work that did not survive
 Livy
 107 of the 142 books of Ab Urbe Condita, a history of Rome are lost
 LonginusOn The End: by Longinus in answer to Plotinus and Gentilianus Amelius (preface survives, quoted by Porphyry)On ImpulseOn PrinciplesLover of AntiquityOn the Natural LifeDifficulties in HomerWhether Homer is a PhilosopherHomeric Problems and SolutionsThings Contrary to History which the Grammarians Explain as HistoricalOn Words in Homer with Multiple SensesAttic DictionLexicon of Antimachus and Heracleon Lucan
 Catachthonion Iliacon from the Trojan cycle
 Epigrammata Adlocutio ad Pollam Silvae Saturnalia Medea Salticae Fabulae Laudes Neronis, a praise of Nero
 Orpheus Prosa oratio in Octavium Sagittam Epistulae ex Campania De Incendio Urbis Gaius Maecenas
 Prometheus; descriptive fragments from some other authors survive. Construct of book is surmised by researchers.
 Manetho
 Ægyptiaca (History of Egypt) in three books. Only few fragments survive.
 Memnon of Heraclea
 History of Heraclea Pontica Minucianus, son of Nicagoras the Athenian sophist
 Art of Rhetoric Progymnasmata Nicagoras, Athenian sophist
 Lives of Famous People On Cleopatra in Troas Embassy Speech to Philip the Roman Emperor Nicander
 Aetolica, a prose history of Aetolia.
 Heteroeumena, a mythological epic.
 Georgica and Melissourgica, of which considerable fragments are preserved.
 Ovid
 Medea, of which only two fragments survive.
 Pamphilus of Alexandria
 Comprehensive lexicon in 95 books of foreign or obscure words.
 Pherecydes of Leros
 A history of Leros
 On Iphigeneia, an essay
 On the Festivals of Dionysus Pherecydes of Athens
 Genealogies of the gods and heroes, originally in ten books; numerous fragments have been preserved.
 Pherecydes of Syros
 Heptamychia Philo of Byblos
 Phoenician History, a Greek translation of the original Phoenician book attributed to Sanchuniathon. Considerable fragments have been preserved, chiefly by Eusebius in the Praeparatio evangelica (i.9; iv.16).
 Pliny the Elder
 History of the German Wars, some quotations survive in Tacitus's Annals and Germania Studiosus, a detailed work on rhetoric
 Dubii sermonis, in eight books
 History of his Times, in thirty-one books, also quoted by Tacitus.
 De jaculatione equestri, a military handbook on missiles thrown from horseback.
 Gaius Asinius Pollio
 Historiae (Histories)
 Epitome by Gaius Asinius Pollio of Tralles
 PraxagorasHistory of Constantine the Great (known from a précis by Photius).
 Prodicus
 On Nature On the Nature of Man "On Propriety of Language"
 On the Choice of Heracles Protagoras
 "On the Gods" (essay)
 On the Art of Disputation On the Original State of Things On Truth Pytheas of Massalia
 τὰ περὶ τοῦ Ὠκεανοῦ (ta peri tou Okeanou) "On the Ocean"
 Gaius Asinius QuadratusThe Millennium, a thousand-year history of Rome; thirty fragments remain
 Quintilian
 De Causis Corruptae Eloquentiae (On the Causes of Corrupted Eloquence)
 Seneca the Younger
 Book on signs, 5000 were compiled
 Against Superstitions, Augustine preserved some passages.
 Book on medicine. Either a planned or lost literary work
 Septimius Severus
 Autobiography The Hellespontine Sibyl Sibylline Books
 Socrates
 Verse versions of Aesop's Fables.
 Speusippus
 On Pythagorean Numbers Strabo
 History Suetonius
 De Viris Illustribus (On Famous Men — in the field of literature), to which belongs: De Illustribus Grammaticis (Lives Of The Grammarians), De Claris Rhetoribus (Lives Of The Rhetoricians), and Lives Of The Poets. Some fragments exist.
 Lives of Famous Whores Royal Biographies Roma (On Rome), in four parts: Roman Manners & Customs, The Roman Year, The Roman Festivals, and Roman Dress.
 Greek Games On Public Offices On Cicero’s Republic The Physical Defects of Mankind Methods of Reckoning Time An Essay on Nature Greek Terms of Abuse Grammatical Problems Critical Signs Used in Books Sulla
 Memoirs, referenced by Plutarch
 Thales
 On the Solstice (possible lost work)
 On the Equinox (possible lost work)
 Tiberius
 Autobiography ("brief and sketchy", per Suetonius)
 Trajan
 Dacica (or De bello dacico)
 Marcus Valerius Messalla Corvinus
 Memoirs of the civil wars after the death of Caesar, used by Suetonius and Plutarch
 Bucolic poems in Greek
 Varro
 Saturarum Menippearum libri CL or Menippean Satires in 150 books Antiquitates rerum humanarum et divinarum libri XLI Logistoricon libri LXXVI Hebdomades vel de imaginibus Disciplinarum libri IX Zenobia
 Epitome of the history of Alexandria and the Orient (according to the Historia Augusta)
 Zoticus
 Story of Atlantis, a poem mentioned by Porphyry
 The work of the Cyclic poets (excluding Homer), specifically:
 six epics of the Epic Cycle: Cypria, Aethiopis, the Little Iliad, the Iliupersis ("Sack of Troy"), Nostoi ("Returns"), and Telegony.
 four epics of the Theban Cycle: Oedipodea, Thebaid, Epigoni (epic), and Alcmeonis.
 other early Greek epics: Titanomachy, Heracleia, Capture of Oechalia, Naupactia, Phocais, MinyasUnnamed works
 Lost plays of Aeschylus. He is believed to have written some 90 plays, of which six plays survive. A seventh play is attributed to him. Fragments of his play Achilleis were said to have been discovered in the wrappings of a mummy in the 1990s.
 Lost plays of Agathon. None of these survive.
 Lost poems of Alcaeus of Mytilene. Of a reported ten scrolls, there exist only quotes and numerous fragments.
 Lost choral poems of Alcman. Of six books of choral lyrics that were known (ca. 50–60 hymns), only fragmentary quotations in other Greek authors were known until the discovery of a fragment in 1855, containing approximately 100 verses. In the 1960s, many more fragments were discovered and published from a dig at Oxyrhynchus.
 Lost poems of Anacreon. Of the five books of lyrical pieces mentioned in the Suda and by Athenaeus, only mere fragments collected from the citations of later writers now exist.
 Lost works of Anaximander. There are a few extant fragments of his works.
 Lost works of Apuleius in many genres, including a novel, Hermagoras, as well as poetry, dialogues, hymns, and technical treatises on politics, dendrology, agriculture, medicine, natural history, astronomy, music, and arithmetic.
 Lost plays of Aristarchus of Tegea. Of 70 pieces, only the titles of three of his plays, with a single line of the text, have survived.
 Lost plays of Aristophanes. He wrote 40 plays, 11 of which survive.
 Lost works of Aristotle. It is believed that we have about one third of his original works.
 Lost work of Aristoxenus. He is said to have written 453 works, dealing with philosophy, ethics and music. His only extant work is Elements of Harmony.
 Lost works of the historian Arrian.
 Lost works of Callimachus. Of about 800 works, in verse and prose; only six hymns, 64 epigrams and some fragments survive; a considerable fragment of the epic Hecale, was discovered in the Rainer papyri.
 Lost works of Chrysippus. Of over 700 written works, none survive, except a few fragments embedded in the works of later authors.
 Lost works of Cicero. Of his books, six on rhetoric have survived, and parts of seven on philosophy. Books 1–3 of his work De re publica have survived mostly intact, as well as a substantial part of book 6. A dialogue on philosophy called Hortensius, which was highly influential on Augustine of Hippo, is lost. Part of De Natura Deorum is lost.
 Lost works of Cleopatra including books on medicine, charms, and cosmetics (according to the historian Al-Masudi).
 Lost works of Clitomachus. According to Diogenes Laërtius, he wrote some 400 books, of which none are extant today, although a few titles are known.
 Lost plays of Cratinus. Only fragments of his works have been preserved.
 Lost works of Democritus. He wrote extensively on natural philosophy and ethics, of which little remains.
 Lost works of Diogenes of Sinope He is reported to have written several books, none of which has survived to the present date. Whether or not these books were actually his writings or attributions are in dispute.
 Lost works of Diphilus. He is said to have written 100 comedies, the titles of 50 of which are preserved.
 Lost works of Ennius. Only fragments of his works survive.
 Lost works of Enoch. According to the Second Book of Enoch, the prophet wrote 360 manuscripts.
 Lost works of Empedocles. Little of what he wrote survives today.
 Lost plays of Epicharmus of Kos. He wrote between 35 and 52 comedies, many of which have been lost or exist only in fragments.
 Lost plays of Euripides. He is believed to have written over 90 plays, 18 of which have survived. Fragments, some substantial, of most other plays also survive.
 Lost plays of Eupolis. Of the 17 plays attributed to him, only fragments remain.
 Lost works of Heraclitus. His writings only survive in fragments quoted by other authors.
 Lost works of Hippasus. Few of his original works now survive.
 Lost works of Hippias. He is credited with an excellent work on Homer, collections of Greek and foreign literature, and archaeological treatises, but nothing remains except the barest notes.
 Lost orations of Hyperides. Some 79 speeches were transmitted in his name in antiquity. A codex of his speeches was seen at Buda in 1525 in the library of King Matthias Corvinus of Hungary, but was destroyed by the Turks in 1526. In 2002, Natalie Tchernetska of Trinity College, Cambridge discovered and identified fragments of two speeches of Hyperides that have been considered lost, Against Timandros and Against Diondas. Six other orations survive in whole or part.
 Lost poems of Ibycus. According to the Suda, he wrote seven books of lyrics.
 Lost works of Juba II. He wrote a number of books in Greek and Latin on history, natural history, geography, grammar, painting and theatre. Only fragments of his work survive.
 Lost works of Leucippus. No writings exist which we can attribute to him.
 Lost works of Lucius Varius Rufus. The author of the poem De morte and the tragedy Thyestes praised by his contemporaries as being on a par with the best Greek poets. Only fragments survive.
 Lost works of Melissus of Samos. Only fragments preserved in other writers' works exist.
 Lost plays of Menander. He wrote over a hundred comedies of which one survives. Fragments of a number of his plays survive.
 Lost poems of Phanocles. He wrote some poems about homosexual relationships among heroes of the mythical tradition of which only one survives, along with a few short fragments.
 Lost works of Philemon. Of his 97 works, 57 are known to us only as titles and fragments.
 Lost poetry of Pindar. Of his varied books of poetry, only his victory odes survive in complete form. The rest are known only by quotations in other works or papyrus scraps unearthed in Egypt.
 Lost plays of Plautus. He wrote approximately 130 plays, of which 21 survive.
 Lost poems and orations of Pliny the Younger.
 Rhetorical works of Julius Pollux.
 There exists a list of more than 60 lost works in many genres by the philosopher Porphyry, including Against the Christians (of which only fragments survive).
 Lost works of Posidonius. All of his works are now lost. Some fragments exist, as well as titles and subjects of many of his books.
 Lost works of Proclus. A number of his commentaries on Plato are lost.
 Lost works of Pyrrhus. He wrote Memoirs and several books on the art of war, all now lost. According to Plutarch, Hannibal was influenced by them and they received praise from Cicero.
 Lost works of Pythagoras. No texts by him survived.
 Lost plays of Rhinthon. Of 38 plays, only a few titles and lines have been preserved.
 Lost poems of Sappho. Only a few full poems and fragments of others survive. It has been hypothesized that poems 61 and 62 of Catullus were inspired by lost works of Sappho.
 Lost poems of Simonides of Ceos. Of his poetry we possess two or three short elegies, several epigrams and about 90 fragments of lyric poetry.
 Lost plays of Sophocles. Of 123 plays, seven survive, with fragments of others.
 Lost poems of Sulpicia, who wrote erotic poems of conjugal bliss and was herself the subject of two poems by Martial, who wrote (10.35) that "All girls who desire to please one man should read Sulpicia. All husbands who desire to please one wife should read Sulpicia."
 Lost poems of Stesichorus. Of several long works, significant fragments survive.
 Lost works of Theodectes. Of his 50 tragedies, we have the names of about 13 and a few unimportant fragments. His treatise on the art of rhetoric and his speeches are lost.
 Lost works of Theophrastus. Of his 227 books, only a handful survive, including On Plants and On Stones, but On Mining is lost. Fragments of others survive.
 Lost works of Timon. None of his works survive except where he is quoted by others, mainly Sextus Empiricus.
 Lost works of Tiro. A biography of Cicero in at least four books is referenced by Asconius Pedianus in his commentaries on Cicero's speeches.
 Lost works of Xenophanes. Fragments of his poetry survive only as quotations by later Greek writers.
 Lost works of Zeno of Elea. None of his works survive intact.
 Lost works of Zeno of Citium. None of his writings have survived except as fragmentary quotations preserved by later writers.

Amerindian texts and codices
 The original Aztec codices were burned by Tlacaelel after Itzcoatl took power.
 Almost all pre-Columbian Aztec and Mayan codices were burnt by Catholic priests.
 Many Inca Quipus (which are considered by some a possible writing system) were burned by Spanish priests in 1583 on the orders of the Third Council of Lima. Only 751 quipus are known to have survived to the present.

Ancient Chinese texts
 Classic of Music attributed to Confucius.
 Medical treatise of the renowned physician Hua Tuo (traditional Chinese: 華佗; simplified Chinese: 华陀; pinyin: Huà Tuó) from late Eastern Han. The treatise was traditionally referred to as Qing Nang Shu (traditional Chinese 青囊書; simplified Chinese: 青囊书; pinyin: Qīng Náng Shū), literally Book in the Cyan Bag. When Hua Tuo was sentenced to death after incurring the wrath of Cao Cao, who controlled the Imperial Court, the physician tried to entrust the text to his gaoler. However, the gaoler was afraid of potentially implicating himself and in disappointment, Hua Tuo had the text burnt. Records of the Three Kingdoms Chapter 29, Book of Wei – Technology 《三国志卷二十九·魏书·方技传》
 Book of Bai Ze (simplified Chinese 白泽图; pinyin: Bái Zé Tú). A guide to the forms and habits of all 11,520 types of supernatural creatures in the world, and how to overcome their hauntings and attacks, as dictated by the mythical creature, Bai Ze to the Yellow Emperor in the 26th century BCE.
 Works of the 5th century BCE philosopher Yang Zhu burnt on the orders of the emperor Shi Huangdi, the founder of the Qin dynasty.

Ancient Indian texts
 Jaya and Bharata, early versions of the Hindu epic Mahabharata Bārhaspatya-sūtras, the foundational text of the Cārvāka school of philosophy. The text probably dates from the final centuries BC, with only fragmentary quotations of it surviving.
 Valayapathi, Tamil epic poem, only fragments survive.
 Kundalakesi, Tamil epic poem, only fragments survive.

Ancient Egyptian texts
The Book of Thoth, a legendary manuscript alluded to in Egyptian literature believed to contain the secrets to comprehend the power of the gods and speech of animals.
Additionally, thousands of other pieces are attributed to the deity Thoth. Seleuces noted that the number of his writings was 20,000 while Manetho held it was 36,525.

 Avestan texts 
 Avesta, the holy book of Zoroaster. After Alexander's conquest, avesta was fragmented and it has been said only third of it survived orally.
 Avesta recollected in 21 volumes, in Sasanian era, only a quarter of which survive.

Gnostic textsThe Seventh Universe of the Prophet Hieralias, an unknown manuscript showing up by name inside the Gnostic piece On the Origin of the World.

Pahlavi / Middle-Persian texts
 Khwātay-Nāmag (Book of Lords) : A chronological history of Iranian kings from the mythical era to the end of Sasanian period. This book was an important reference for post-Sasanian and Islamic historians such as Ibn al-Muqaffa' as well as Ferdowsi in his epic work Shahnameh'".
 Ewen-Nāmag: Multi-volume book on Iranian ceremonies, entertainment, warfare, politics, precepts, principles and examples in the Sasanian era.
 Zij-i Shahryār: An important work of astronomy.
 Karirak ud Damanak: A version translated into Pahlavi of the Indian work of fiction Pancatantra.
 Hazār Afsān or Thousand Tales: A Pahlavi compilation of Iranian and Indian tales. This work was translated to Arabic in the Islamic era and became known as One Thousand and One Nights.
 Mazdak-Nāmag: Biography of Mazdak, the Zoroastrian reformer and the primate of Mazdakism movement.
 Kārvand: A book of rhetoric.
 Jāvidan Khrad (Immortal wisdom): Quotations of the mythical Iranian king and sage Hushang.
 Scientific Works of Gondishapur Academy: Works of Greek, Indian, and Persian scholars of the Academy of Gondishapur on medicine, astrology, and philosophy. A remarkable part of their heritage was translated into Arabic during the Graeco-Arabic translation movement.

The Middle-Persian literature had a remarkable diversity based on historical accounts. Only a poor part of mostly religious texts survived by Zoroastrian minorities in Persia and India.

Manichaean texts
 Ardahang (Arzhang): The holy pictured book of Manichaeism.
 Shabuhragan: The holy book of Mani dedicated to Shapur the Great; only fragments survive.

Lost Biblical texts

 Hexapla: a compilation of the Old Testament by Origen.

Lost texts referenced in the Old Testament
 The book referred to at Exodus 17:14. Write this for a memorial in the book and recount it in the hearing of Joshua ...
 The Book of the Covenant referred to at Exodus 24:7
 The Book of the Wars of the Lord (Numbers 21:14)
 Book of Jasher
 Manner of the Kingdom
 Acts of Solomon
 Chronicles of the Kings of Israel
 Chronicles of the Kings of Judah
 Book of the Kings of Israel
 Annals of King David
 Book of Samuel the Seer
 Book of Nathan the Prophet
 Book of Gad the Seer
 History of Nathan the Prophet
 Prophecy of Ahijah
 Visions of Iddo the Seer
 Book of Shemaiah the Prophet
 Iddo Genealogies
 Story of the Prophet Iddo
 Book of the Kings of Judah and Israel
 Book of Jehu
 Story of the Book of Kings
 Acts of Uziah
 Acts of the Kings of Israel
 Sayings of the Seers
 Laments for Josiah
 Chronicles of King Ahasuerus
 Chronicles of the Kings of Media and Persia

Lost works referenced in Deutero-canonical texts
The five volume account of the Maccabean revolt compiled by Jason of Cyrene, abridged by the writer of 2 Maccabees

Lost works referenced in the New Testament
 Epistle to Corinth
 Epistle from Laodicea to the Colossians

Lost works pertaining to Jesus
(These works are generally 2nd century and later; some would be considered reflective of proto-orthodox Christianity, and others would be heterodox.)
 Gospel of Eve
 Gospel of Mani
 Gospel of Matthias
 Gospel of Perfection
 Gospel of the Four Heavenly Realms
 Gospel of the Hebrews
 Gospel of the Seventy
 Gospel of the Twelve
 Memoria Apostolorum
 Secret Gospel of Mark

2nd century
 Hegesippus' Hypomnemata (Memoirs) in five books, and a history of the Christian church.
 The Gospel of the Lord compiled by Marcion of Sinope to support his interpretation of Christianity. Marcion's writings were suppressed but a portion of them have been recreated from the works that were used to denounce them.
 Papias' Exposition of the Oracles of the Lord in five books, mentioned by Eusebius of Caesarea.

3rd century
Edict of Decius, 250 AD
 Various works of Tertullian. Some fifteen works in Latin or Greek are lost, some as recently as the 9th century (De Paradiso, De superstitione saeculi, De carne et anima were all extant in the now damaged Codex Agobardinus in 814 AD).

4th century
 Praeparatio Ecclesiastica, and Demonstratio Ecclesiastica by Eusebius of Caesarea

5th century
 Sozomen's history of the Christian church, from the Ascension of Jesus to the defeat of Licinius in 323, in twelve books.
 Renatus Profuturus Frigeridus, a historical work of twelve volumes of which only brief fragments survive, a few passages being quoted  in chapters eight and nine of the second book of Gregory of Tours' Decem libri historiarum (Ten Books of Histories)

6th century
 Cassiodorus's Gothic History, which survives only in a much shorter abridgement, the Getica of Jordanes

7th century
 The Kakinomoto no Ason Hitomaro Kashū is lost as a standalone work, although an unknown portion of it was preserved as part of the later Man'yōshū.

Anglo-Saxon works
 The Battle of Maldon, a heroic poem of which only 325 lines in the middle survive.
 Waldere, an epic which is now lost apart from two short fragments.
 The Finnesburg Fragment, comprising 50 lines from an otherwise lost poem.
Bede's translation of John's Gospel, c. 735.

12th century
 Three works by Gerald of Wales:
 Vita sancti Karadoci ("Life of St Caradoc")
 De fidei fructu fideique defectu
 Cambriae mappa
 A romance on the subject of King Mark and Iseult by Chrétien de Troyes.
 The Old French romances André de France and Gui d'Excideuil
 Skjöldunga saga, a Norse saga on the legendary Danish dynasty of the Skjöldungs, composed c. 1180–1200
 Gauks saga Trandilssonar, a lost saga of the Icelanders.
Life of Despot Stefan Lazarević is a work first written in 1166 but the only surviving chronicle is from 1431 by Constantine of Kostenets who includes a genealogy of the Nemanjić dynasty up until Despot Stefan Lazarević.
 William of Tyre's Gesta orientalium principum, a history of the Islamic world

14th century
 Inventio Fortunata. A 14th-century description of the geography of the North Pole.
 Itinerarium. A geography book by Jacobus Cnoyen of 's-Hertogenbosch, cited by Gerardus Mercator
 Res gestae Arturi britanni (The Deeds of Arthur of Britain). A book cited by Jacobus Cnoyen
 Of the Wreched Engendrynge of Mankynde, Origenes upon the Maudeleyne, and The book of the Leoun. Three works by Geoffrey Chaucer.
 The Coventry Mystery Plays, a cycle of which only two plays survive.
 Carostavnik or Rodoslov. Old Serbian biography enters a new—historiographic or even chronographic—phase with the appearance of the so-called Vita, better yet "Lives of Serbian Kings and Archbishops" by Danilo II, Serbian Archbishop formerly Abbot of the Hilandar Monastery and his successors, most of whom remained anonymous.
Vrhobreznica Chronicle originates in 1371 but the work is not transcribed until two and half centuries later by a writer named Gavrilo, a hermit, who collected earlier annals in his redaction composed in 1650 at the Vrhobreznica monastery. Part of a manuscript archived as Prague Museum #29 (together with Vrhobreznica Genealogy).
 Koporin Chronicle	– a 1371 chronicle transcribed in 1453 by Damjan, a deacon, who also wrote the annals on the order of Archbishop of Zeta, Josif, at the Koporin monastery.
 Studenica Chronicle – a 14th century chronicle from 1350–1400. Oldest survived copy in a 16th-century manuscript, together with a younger annals.
 Cetinje Chronicle	covers events from 14th century until the end of 16th century, though the manuscript collection is from the end of the 16th century.

15th century
 Yongle Encyclopedia. It was one of the world's earliest, and the then-largest, encyclopaedia commissioned by the Yongle Emperor of China's Ming dynasty in 1403, completed about 1408. About 400 volumes (less than 4%) of a 16th-century manuscript set survive today.
 François Villon's poem "The Romance of the Devil's Fart."

16th century
 Nigramansir. A Moral Interlude and a Pithy. by John Skelton. Printed 1504. A copy seen in 1759 in Chichester has since vanished.
 Ur-Hamlet. An earlier version of the William Shakespeare play Hamlet. Some scholars believe it to be a lost work written by Thomas Kyd, while others attribute it to Shakespeare, identifying the Ur-Hamlet with the first quarto text.
 Love's Labour's Won, play by William Shakespeare.
 The Ocean to Cynthia. A poem by Sir Walter Raleigh of which only fragments are known.
 Luís de Camões' philosophic work The Parnasum of Luís Vaz is lost.
 The Isle of Dogs (1597), a play by Thomas Nashe and Ben Jonson.
 Phaethon, a play by Thomas Dekker, mentioned in Philip Henslowe's diary, 1597.
 Hot Anger Soon Cold a play by Henry Chettle, Henry Porter and Ben Jonson; mentioned in Philip Henslowe's diary, August 1598.
 The Stepmother's Tragedy, a play by Henry Chettle and Thomas Dekker; mentioned in Philip Henslowe's diary, August 1599.
 Black Bateman of the North, Part II, a play by Henry Chettle and Robert Wilson; mentioned in Henslowe's diary in April 1598.
 Only four Maya codices survived the Spanish conquest; most were destroyed by conquistadors or the Roman Catholic Church.

17th century
 The History of Cardenio, play by William Shakespeare and John Fletcher (1613)
 Keep the Widow Waking, play by John Ford and John Webster (1624)
 Claudio Monteverdi composed at least eighteen operas, but only three (L'Orfeo, L'incoronazione di Poppea, and Il ritorno d'Ulisse in patria) and the famous aria, Lamento, from his second opera L'Arianna have survived.
 Lost haikus of Ihara Saikaku.
 Jean Racine's first play, Amasie (1660) is lost.
 John Milton wrote nearly two acts of a tragedy called Adam Unparadiz'd, which was then lost.
 Lost works of Molière:
 A translation of De Rerum Natura by Lucretius.
 Le Docteur amoureux (play, 1658)
 Gros-René, petit enfant (play, 1659)
 Le Docteur Pédant (play, 1660)
 Les Trois Docteurs (play, ca. 1660)
 Gorgibus dans le sac (play, 1661)
 Le Fagotier (play, 1661)
 Le Fin Lourdaut (play attributed, 1668)
 Lost works of Dubhaltach Mac Fhirbhisigh include;
 Ughdair Ereann. Fragments survive
 Works by Buhurizade Mustafa Itri, a major Ottoman musician, composer, singer and poet, who is known to have composed more than a thousand works, only forty of which survive to the present.

18th century
 All poems and literary works by Carlo Gimach, except for the cantata Applauso Genetliaco, are believed to be lost.
 Lady Mary Wortley Montagu's journal was burnt by her daughter on the grounds that it contained much scandal and satire.
 Edward Gibbon burned the manuscript of his History of the Liberty of the Swiss.
 Adam Smith had most of his manuscripts destroyed shortly before his death. In his last years he had been working on two major treatises, one on the theory and history of law and one on the sciences and arts. The posthumously published Essays on Philosophical Subjects (1795) probably contain parts of what would have been the latter treatise.
 The Green-Room Squabble or a Battle Royal between the Queen of Babylon and the Daughter of Darius, a 1756 play by Samuel Foote, is lost.
 Numerous works by J. S. Bach, notably at least two large-scale Passions and many cantatas (see List of Bach cantatas) are lost.
 Mozart's Cello Concerto in F and Trumpet Concerto are lost.
 Beethoven's 1793 'Ode to Joy', which was later incorporated into his ninth Symphony
 Haydn's "Double Bass Concerto", of which only the first two measures survive; the rest were burned and destroyed. Supposedly a copy of it may exist somewhere, according to many different speculations.
 Personal letters between George Washington and his wife Martha Washington; all but three destroyed by Mrs. Washington after his death in 1799.

19th century
 Aaron Burr's farewell address to the senate in 1805 has been lost, though the general outlines are known through contemporaneous comments. 
 Memoirs of Lord Byron, destroyed by his literary executors led by John Murray on 17 May 1824. The decision to destroy Byron's manuscript journals, which was opposed only by Thomas Moore, was made in order to protect his reputation. The two volumes of memoirs were dismembered and burnt in the fireplace at Murray's office.
 The Scented Garden by Sir Richard Francis Burton, a manuscript of a new translation from Arabic of The Perfumed Garden, was burned by his widow, Lady Isabel Burton née Arundel, along with other papers.
 A large number of manuscripts and longer poems by William Blake were burnt soon after his death by Mr. Frederick Tatham.
 Parts two and three of Dead Souls by Nikolai Gogol, burned by Gogol at the instigation of the priest Father Matthew Konstantinovskii.
 At least four complete volumes and around seven pages of text are missing from Lewis Carroll's thirteen diaries, destroyed by his family for reasons frequently debated.
 The son of the Marquis de Sade had all of de Sade's unpublished manuscripts burned after de Sade's death in 1814; this included the immense multi-volume work Les Journées de Florbelle.
 A large section of the manuscript for Mary Shelley's Lodore was lost in the mail to the publisher, and Shelley was forced to rewrite it.
 Gerard Manley Hopkins burned all his early poetry on entering the priesthood.
 In the Suspiria de Profundis of Thomas De Quincey, 18 of 32 pieces have not survived.
 Alexander Ivanovich Galich's completed manuscripts Universal Rights and Philosophy of Human History were destroyed in a fire, an event the grieved Galich did not long survive.
 Margaret Fuller's manuscript on the history of the 1849 Roman Republic was lost in the 1850 shipwreck in which Fuller herself, her husband and her child perished. In Fuller's own estimation, as well as of others who saw it, this work, based on her first-hand experience in Rome, might have been her most important work. 
 A schoolmate of Arthur Rimbaud claimed that he lost a notebook of poems by the famous poet, the "Cahier Labarrière", which reportedly contained about 60 poems (if true, and if all were distinct from his known verse poems, this would represent about as much in volume). Paul Verlaine also mentioned a text called "La Chasse spirituelle", claiming it to be Rimbaud's masterpiece, which was never found (although a fake was published in 1949).
 The first draft of Thomas Carlyle's The French Revolution: A History was sent to John Stuart Mill, whose maid mistakenly burned it, forcing Carlyle to rewrite it from scratch.
 Joseph Smith's translation of the Book of Lehi from the Mormon Golden Plates was either hidden, destroyed, or modified by Lucy Harris, the wife of transcriber Martin Harris. Whatever their fate, the pages were not returned to Joseph Smith and declared "lost." Smith did not recreate the translation.
 Isle of the Cross, Herman Melville's followup to the unsuccessful Pierre was rejected by his publishers and has subsequently been lost.
 Robert Louis Stevenson burned his first completed draft of Strange Case of Dr. Jekyll and Mr. Hyde after his wife criticized the work. Stevenson wrote and published a revised version.
 Abraham Lincoln's Lost Speech, given on May 29, 1856, in Bloomington, Illinois. Traditionally regarded as lost because it was so engaging that reporters neglected to take notes, the speech is believed to have been an impassioned condemnation of slavery.
 L. Frank Baum's theatre in Richburg, New York burned to the ground. Among the manuscripts of Baum's original plays known to have been lost are The Mackrummins, Matches (which was being performed the night of the fire), The Queen of Killarney, Kilmourne, or O'Connor's Dream, and the complete musical score for The Maid of Arran, which survives only in commercial song sheets, which include six of the eight songs and no instrumental music.
 Leon Trotsky describes the loss of an unfinished play manuscript (a collaboration with Sokolovsky) in his My Life, end of chapter 6 (sometime between 1896 and 1898).
 The Poor Man and the Lady. Thomas Hardy's first novel (1867) was never published. After rejection by several publishers, he destroyed the manuscript.
 George Gissing abandoned many novels and destroyed the incomplete manuscripts. He also completed at least three novels which went unpublished and have been lost.
 John P. Marquand wrote an early novel called Yellow Ivory in collaboration with his friend W.A. Macdonald.
 During the many years of his career, Mark Twain produced a vast number of pieces, of which a considerable part, especially in his earlier years, was published in obscure newspapers under a great variety of pen names, or not published at all. Joe Goodman, who had been Twain's editor when he worked at the Virginia City, Nevada, "Territorial Enterprise", declared in 1900 that Twain wrote some of the best material of his life during his "Western years" in the late 1860s, but most of it was lost.  In addition, many of Twain's speeches and lectures have been lost or were never written down. Researchers continue to seek this material, some of which was rediscovered as recently as 1995.
 Although frequently referenced in the Oxford English Dictionary and traceable in several catalogues of libraries and booksellers, no copy of the 1852 book Meanderings of Memory by Nightlark could be tracked down.
 The Reverend Francis Kilvert's diaries were edited and censored, possibly by his widow, after his death in 1879. In the 1930s, the surviving diaries were passed on to William Plomer, who transcribed them, before returning the originals to Kilvert's closest living relative, a niece, who destroyed most of the manuscripts. Plomer's own transcription was destroyed in the Blitz. He only learned of the originals' destruction when he planned to publish a complete edition in the 1950s.
 Jean Sibelius's Karelia Music was destroyed after its premiere in 1893. What survives today fully are the Karelia Ouverture and the Karelia Suite. Most of the music was reconstructed in 1965 by Kalevi Kuosa, from the original parts that had survived. The parts that hadn't survived were those of the violas, cellos, and double basses. Based on Kuosa's transcription, the Finnish composers Kalevi Aho and Jouni Kaipainen have individually reconstructed the complete music to Karelia Music.

20th century
 James Joyce's play A Brilliant Career (which he burned) and the first half of his novel Stephen Hero. His grandson Stephen later burned Nora Joyce's letters to James as well.
 J. Meade Falkner left an almost complete fourth and last novel on a train and felt he was too old to start again.
 A number of Scott Joplin's compositions have been lost, including his first opera, A Guest of Honor.
 Various parts of Daniel Paul Schreber's "Memoirs of My Nervous Illness" (original German title "Denkwürdigkeiten eines Nervenkranken") (1903) were destroyed by his wife and doctor Flesching for protecting his reputation, which was mentioned by Sigmund Freud as highly important in his essay "The Schreber Case" (1911).
 L. Frank Baum wrote four novels for adults that were never published and disappeared: Our Married Life and Johnson (1912), The Mystery of Bonita (1914), and Molly Oodle (1915). Baum's son claimed that Baum's wife burned these, but this was after being cut out of her will. Evidence that Baum's publisher received these manuscripts survives. Also lost are Baum's 1904 short stories "Mr. Rumple's Chill" and "Bess of the Movies", as well as his early plays Kilmourne, or O'Connor's Dream (opened April 4, 1883) and The Queen of Killarney (1883).
 In 1907, August Strindberg destroyed a play, The Bleeding Hand, immediately after writing it. He was in a bad mood at the time and commented in a letter that the piece was unusually harsh, even for him.
 "Text I" of Seven Pillars of Wisdom, a 250,000-word manuscript by T. E. Lawrence lost at Reading railway station in December 1919.
 In 1922, a suitcase with almost all of Ernest Hemingway's work to date was stolen from a train compartment at the Gare de Lyon in Paris, from his wife. It included a partial World War I novel.
 The novels Tobold and Theodor by Robert Walser are lost, possibly destroyed by the author, as is a third, unnamed novel. (1910–1921)
 The original version of Ultramarine by Malcolm Lowry was stolen from his publisher's car in 1932, and the author had to reconstruct it.
 Jean Sibelius burned his unfinished 8th Symphony and several of his unfinished works in the 1920s
 Yogananda's Autobiography of a Yogi quotes extensively from Richard Wright's travel diaries in 1935/6.  Following Wright's death they have become 'lost'.
 In 1938 George Orwell wrote Socialism and War, an "anti-war pamphlet" for which he could not find a publisher. Although many previously unknown letters and other documents relating to Orwell have been discovered in recent years, no trace of this pamphlet has yet come to light. With the beginning of World War II Orwell's views on pacifism were to change radically, so he may well have destroyed the manuscript.
 Lost papers and a possible unfinished novel by Isaac Babel, confiscated by the NKVD, May 1939.
 Manuscript of Efebos, a novel by Karol Szymanowski, destroyed in bombing of Warsaw, 1939.
 Five volumes of poetry and a drama, all in manuscript, by Saint-John Perse were destroyed at his house outside Paris soon after he had gone into exile in the summer of 1940. The diplomat Alexis Léger (Perse's real name) was a well-known and uncompromising anti-Nazi and his house was raided by German troops. The works had been written during his diplomat years, but Perse had decided not to publish any new writing until he had retired from diplomacy.
 Walter Benjamin had a completed manuscript in his suitcase when he fled France and arrest by the Nazis in the summer of 1940. He committed suicide in Portbou, Spain on September 26, 1940, and the suitcase and its contents disappeared.
 There are reports that Bruno Schulz worked on a novel called The Messiah, but no trace of this manuscript survived his death (1942).
 The novel In Ballast to the White Sea by Malcolm Lowry, lost in a fire in 1945.
 The novel Wanderers of Night and poems of Daniil Andreev were destroyed in 1947 as "anti-Soviet literature" by the MGB.
 Some pages of William Burroughs's original version of Naked Lunch were stolen.
 Three early, unpublished novels by Philip K. Dick written in the 1950s are no longer extant: A Time for George Stavros, Pilgrim on the Hill, and Nicholas and the Higs.
 In 1958, while working on the last chapter, William H. Gass' novel Omensetter's Luck was stolen off of his desk, forcing him to begin from scratch.
 The manuscript for Sylvia Plath's unfinished second novel, provisionally titled Double Exposure, or Double Take, written 1962–63, disappeared some time before 1970.
 Venedikt Yerofeyev's novel Dmitry Shostakovich was in a bag with two bottles of fortified wine that was stolen from him in a commuter train in 1972.
 Several pages of the original screenplay for Werner Herzog's Aguirre, der Zorn Gottes were reportedly thrown out of the window of a bus after one of his football teammates threw up on them.
 The screenplay for the proposed Dean Stockwell-Herb Berman film After the Gold Rush is reportedly lost.
 Diaries of Philip Larkin – burnt at his request after his death on 2 December 1985. Other private papers were kept, contrary to his instructions.
 The fourth novel of Sasha Sokolov have been lost when the Greek house where it was written burnt down in the second half the 1980s.
 Jacob M. Appel's first novel manuscript, Paste and Cover, was in the trunk of an automobile that was stolen in Providence, Rhode Island, in 1998. The vehicle was recovered, but the manuscript was not.

21st century
 Terry Pratchett's unfinished works were destroyed in 2017 after his death, fulfilling his last will; his computer hard drive containing his unfinished works was deliberately squished by a steamroller.

Lost literary collections

 Chinese emperor Qin Shi Huang (3rd century BCE) had most previously existing books burned when he consolidated his power. See Burning of books and burying of scholars.
 The Library of Alexandria, the largest library in existence during antiquity, was destroyed at some point in time between the Roman and Muslim conquests of Alexandria.
 Aztec emperor Itzcoatl (ruled 1427/8-1440) ordered the burning of all historical Aztec codices in an effort to develop a state-sanctioned Aztec history and mythology.
 During the Dissolution of the Monasteries, many monastic libraries were destroyed. Worcester Abbey had 600 books at the time of the dissolution. Only six of them have survived intact to the present day. At the abbey of the Augustinian Friars at York, a library of 646 volumes was destroyed, leaving only three surviving books. Some books were destroyed for their precious bindings, others were sold off by the cartload, including irreplaceable early English works. It is believed that many of the earliest Anglo-Saxon manuscripts were lost at this time.
 "A great nombre of them whych purchased those supertycyous mansyons, resrved of those lybrarye bokes, some to serve theyr jakes [i.e., as toilet paper], some to scoure candelstyckes, and some to rubbe their bootes. Some they solde to the grossers and soapsellers..." — John Bale, 1549
 Many works of Anglo-Saxon literature, mostly unique and unpublished, were burned when a fire broke out in the Cotton library at Ashburnham House on 23 October 1731. Luckily, the only surviving manuscript of Beowulf survived the fire and was printed for the first time in 1815.
 In 1193, the Nalanda University was sacked by Bakhtiyar Khilji. The burning of the library continued for several months and "smoke from the burning manuscripts hung for days like a dark pall over the low hills."
 The sacking of Baghdad by the Mongols.
 At least 27 Maya codices were ceremonially destroyed by Diego de Landa (1524–1579), bishop of Yucatán, on 12 July 1562.
 The library of the Hanlin Academy, containing irreplaceable ancient Chinese manuscripts, was mostly destroyed in 1900 during the Boxer Rebellion.
 The Sikh Reference Library in Amritsar, a collection of rare books, newspapers, manuscripts, and other literary works related to Sikhism and India, was looted and incinerated by Indian troops during the 1984 Operation Blue Star. The missing literature has not been recovered to this day and are presumbed to be lost. The library hosted a vast collection of an estimated 20,000 literary works just before the destruction, including 11,107 books, 2,500 manuscripts, newspaper archives, historical letters, documents/files, and others.
 During the 2014 unrest in Bosnia and Herzegovina, sections of the National Archives in Sarajevo were set on fire. Large numbers of historical documents were lost, many of them dating from the 1878–1918 Austro-Hungarian rule in Bosnia and Herzegovina, the interwar period, and the 1941–1945 rule of the Independent State of Croatia. About 15,000 files from the 1996–2003 Human Rights Chamber for Bosnia and Herzegovina were also destroyed.

Rediscovered works
 Gospel of Judas, a fragmentary Coptic codex rediscovered and translated, 2006.
 W. A. Mozart and Antonio Salieri are known to have composed together a cantata for voice and piano called Per la ricuperata salute di Ofelia which was celebrating the return to stage of the singer Nancy Storace, and which has been lost, although it had been printed by Artaria in 1785. The music had been considered lost until November 2015, when German musicologist and composer Timo Jouko Herrmann identified the score while searching for music by one of Salieri's ostensible pupils, Antonio Casimir Cartellieri, in the archives of the Czech Museum of Music in Prague.
 The 120 Days of Sodom, written by the Marquis de Sade in the Bastille prison in 1785, was considered lost by its author (and was much lamented by him) after the storming and looting of 1789. It was rediscovered in the walls of his cell and published in 1904.
 Antonín Dvořák composed his Symphony No. 1 in 1865. It was subsequently lost, which the composer believed to be final and irreversible. It was only found again in 1923, twenty years after Dvořák's death, and performed for the first time in 1936. 
 A Tale of Kitty in Boots by Beatrix Potter, the handwritten manuscripts for this story were found in school notebooks, including a few illustrations. She intended to finish the book, but was interrupted by wars and marriage and farming. It was found nearly 100 years later and published for the first time in September 2016.
 Lesbian Love, by Eva Kotchever, had only 150 copies published "for private circulation only" in 1925. Historian Jonathan Ned Katz searched and found the only known copy, owned by Nina Alvarez, who had found the book in the lobby of her apartment building in 1998 in Albany, New York. Records show that another copy was held in the Sterling Library at Yale University, but it has not been located.
 Henri Poincaré's prize-winning submission for the 1889 celestial mechanics contest of king Oscar II was thought to be lost.  While this version was being printed, Poincaré himself discovered a serious error.  The existing version was recalled and then replaced by a heavily modified and corrected version, now regarded as the seminal description of chaos theory.  The original erroneous submission was thought to be lost, but it was found in 2011.

Lost works in popular culture
 Umberto Eco's The Name of the Rose features a murder mystery whose solution hinges on the contents of Aristotle's lost second book of Poetics (dealing with comedy).
 Dan Brown's The Da Vinci Code builds its central theme around a fictional account of the apocryphal and partially lost Gnostic Gospels.
 Joe Haldeman's science fiction novel The Hemingway Hoax centers on a suitcase with writings by Ernest Hemingway which was stolen in 1922 at the Gare de Lyon in Paris.
 "The Shakespeare Code" is a Doctor Who episode that explains the fate of Love's Labour's Won.
 The Mysteries of Harris Burdick is presented as a series of images ostensibly created by one Harris Burdick, who had intended to use  them for his children's books before he mysteriously disappeared. Each image is accompanied by a title and a single line of text, which encourage readers to create their own stories.
 H. P. Lovecraft wrote that all the original Arabic copies of The Necronomicon (Al Azif) have been destroyed, as well as the Arabic to Greek translations. Only five Greek to Latin translations are held by libraries, though copies may exist in private collections.

See also

 Apocrypha
 Art theft
 Bonfire of the Vanities
 Iconoclasm
 Link rot
 List of comics solicited but never published
 List of destroyed heritage
 List of lost films
 List of missing treasures
 List of unpublished books
 Lost artworks
 Lost film
 Unfinished creative work
 Lost television broadcast
 :hu:Elpusztult nevezetes magyar dokumentumok listája (List of famous Hungarian documents that were destroyed [in Hungarian])

References

Further reading
 Browne, Thomas. Musaeum Clausum or Bibliotheca Abscondita (published posthumously in 1683)
 Deuel, Leo. Testaments of Time: The Search for Lost Manuscripts and Records (New York: Knopf, 1965)
 Dudbridge, Glen. Lost Books of Medieval China (London: The British Library, 2000)
 Kelly, Stuart. The Book of Lost Books (Viking, 2005) 
 Peter, Hermann. Historicorum Romanorum reliquiae (2 vols., B.G. Teubner, Leipzig, 1870, 2nd ed. 1914–16)
 Wilson. R. M. The Lost Literature of Medieval England (London: Methuen, 1952)

External links
 List of Lost Literature article category section on The Lost Media Wiki
 Discoveries of Lost Classical Literature
 Longing for Great Lost Works
 Lost works of Tertullian
 Lost Works of Berosus
 Lost Works of W.A. Mozart
 Weighing Words Over Last Wishes
 Fragmentary Tragedies of Sophocles Project
 In Search of a Lost JG Ballard Novel
 Hi-tech imaging could reveal lost texts
 The Suppression of Lesbian and Gay History
 The Memorial of Unsaved Work